Supermerk2 is an Argentine cumbia villera group founded in 2003 by Óscar "Chanchín" Sotelo and Cristian "Malon" Britez. Their vocal style influenced by Bahiano from Los Pericos. Their single "Que Calor" became their first hit single, being certified gold.

Discography 

 La Lata (2003)
 Suena Rototon"" (2004)
 A puro Saqueee-ooo (2005)
 Es lo que hay (2006)
 Grandes Exitos RMX (2007)
 ¿Qué no vale nada? (2009)
 Podran imitarnos, jamás igualarnos'' (2013)

References

Latin music groups